The 10th FINA World Swimming Championships (25 m)  was held in Dubai, United Arab Emirates from 15–19 December 2010. This swimming-only championships took place in the Dubai Sports Complex; all events were swum in a 25-meter (short-course) pool.

FINA announced on April 9, 2006 that Dubai had defeated the only other bidder Istanbul, Turkey, 11 votes to 10, after a meeting of the FINA Bureau in Shanghai, China.

The USA topped the medal standings with a total of 25 medals. A total of 57 Championship Records were set, and 4 World Records. American Ryan Lochte and Spaniard Mireia Belmonte were named swimmers of the competition. Lochte became the first individual ever to win 7 medals at a Short Course Worlds, and became the first individual to swim a World Record since suits-rule changes went into effect in January 2010. Belmonte won a total of four medals, tied for the most with American Rebecca Soni.

Participating nations
The entry list released on the FINA website before the championships contained 153 countries.

Results

Men's events

 Swimmers who participated in the heats only and received medals.

Women's events

Medal table

Highlights
For a list of day-by-day highlights from the 2010 Short Course Worlds, please see:
2010 FINA World Swimming Championships (25 m) – Highlights

Records
For a list of records set at the 2010 Short Course Worlds, please see this entry:
2010 FINA World Swimming Championships (25m) – Records

Controversy
At the time of the event, Israel and the United Arab Emirates had no diplomatic relations; however, UAE officials said they would issue visas to the Israeli delegation attending the competition. As such, the Israeli delegation was eventually let into the country and were able to get to the Championships before racing actually started, but it was not without difficulties and several delays. Among the reported issue were that the Israelis were not issued visas nor were their passports stamped, and their arrival was delayed to just before competition started.

Notes and references

Daily reports
 Dubai, Day 1: China sets first WR of the year and Spain gets first gold ever. FINA. Retrieved on 2010-12-15.
 Dubai, Day 2: Two more WR and tied match (3-3) between USA and Russia. FINA. Retrieved on 2010-12-16.
 Dubai, Day 3: Lochte imperial sets WR in the 200m IM. FINA. Retrieved on 2010-12-17.
 Dubai, Day 4: Belmonte Garcia (ESP), a new Star is born. FINA. Retrieved on 2010-12-18.
 Dubai, Day 5: Lochte (USA), first ever with 7 medals in one championships. FINA. Retrieved on 2010-12-19.

See also
2010 in swimming
List of World Championships records in swimming

References
 Official event website
 Summons for the 10th FINA World Swimming Championships (25m)
 Psych Sheets for 2010 Dubai Short Course World Championships

 
FINA World Swimming Championships (25 m)
FINA World Swimming Championships (25 m)
FINA World Swimming Championships (25 m)
FINA World Swimming Championships (25 m)
International
Sports competitions in Dubai
December 2010 sports events in Asia
2010s in Dubai